"Up All Night" is a song by the San Diego-based rock band Unwritten Law, released as the first single from the band's 2002 album Elva. It was written by singer Scott Russo and produced by Michael "Miguel" Happoldt. It was their second song to chart, reaching number 14 on Billboard's Modern Rock Tracks chart.

Track listing

Personnel

Band
Scott Russo – vocals, mix engineer of "Darkside", producer of "Baby, Baby"
Steve Morris – lead guitar, producer of "Baby, Baby"
Rob Brewer – rhythm guitar
Pat "PK" Kim – bass guitar
Wade Youman – drums

Additional musicians
Josh Freese – drums on "Up All Night"
Marshall Goodman – percussion on "Up All Night"

Production
Miguel – producer of "Up All Night", additional production on "Darkside"
John Shanks – producer of "Darkside"
David J. Holman – mix engineer of "Up All Night"
Eddie Ashworth – engineer of "Up All Night" and "Darkside"
Mike McMullen – assistant engineer of "Up All Night", additional engineering on "Darkside"
Dan Chase and Baraka – Pro Tools on "Up All Night" and "Darkside"
Tal Herzberg – Pro Tools on "Darkside"
Mark DeSisto – engineer of "Darkside"
Toby Miller – mix engineer of "Darkside"
Brian Garder – mastering

Artwork
Dean Karr – photography

Charts

References

2000 songs
Unwritten Law songs
Interscope Records singles